Lutterothstraße is a metro station on the Hamburg U-Bahn line U2. The underground station was opened in May 1965 and is located in the Hamburg district of Eimsbüttel, Germany. Eimsbüttel is center of the Hamburg borough of Eimsbüttel.

Trains 
Lutterothstraße is served by Hamburg U-Bahn line U2; departures are every 5 minutes.

Gallery

See also 

 List of Hamburg U-Bahn stations

References

External links 

 Line and route network plans at hvv.de 

Hamburg U-Bahn stations in Hamburg
U2 (Hamburg U-Bahn) stations
Buildings and structures in Eimsbüttel
Railway stations in Germany opened in 1965
1965 establishments in West Germany